Seidl is a surname. Notable people with the surname include:

Anton Seidl (1850–1898), Hungarian conductor
Florian Seidl (born 1979), vehicle designer
Franziska Seidl (1892–1983), Austrian physicist
Gabriel von Seidl (1848–1913), German architect
Johann Gabriel Seidl (1804–1875), Austrian archaeologist, lyricist, narrator and dramatist
Mario Seidl (born 1992), Austrian nordic combined skier
Siegfried Seidl (1911–1947), Commander of the concentration camp at Theresienstadt executed for war crimes
Ulrich Seidl (born 1952), director, screenwriter and producer

See also
Seidel (disambiguation)
Surnames of Austrian origin

German-language surnames
Surnames from given names